John Joseph Smith (January 25, 1904 – February 16, 1980) was an American lawyer, a United States representative from Connecticut, a United States circuit judge of the United States Court of Appeals for the Second Circuit and a United States district judge of the United States District Court for the District of Connecticut.

Education and career

Born in Waterbury, Connecticut, Smith attended the public schools, and earned his Bachelor of Arts degree from Yale University in 1925 and his Bachelor of Laws from Yale's law department (later Yale Law School) in 1927. Smith was admitted to the bar in 1927. He was a research fellow at Yale Law School from 1927 to 1928. Smith served in the Field Artillery Reserves from 1925 to 1935. He was in private practice in Waterbury from 1928 to 1941.

Congressional service

Smith was elected as a Democrat to the United States House of Representatives, serving as a United States representative from Connecticut from 1935 to 1941 (in the Seventy-fourth, Seventy-fifth, Seventy-sixth, and Seventy-seventh Congresses). He resigned from Congress on November 4, 1941, to accept appointment to the federal bench.

Federal judicial service

Smith was nominated by President Franklin D. Roosevelt on October 16, 1941, to a seat on the United States District Court for the District of Connecticut vacated by Judge Edwin Stark Thomas. He was confirmed by the United States Senate on October 28, 1941, and received his commission on October 30, 1941. He served as Chief Judge from 1953 to 1960. His service terminated on September 13, 1960, due to his elevation to the Second Circuit.

Smith was nominated by President Dwight D. Eisenhower on January 11, 1960, to a seat on the United States Court of Appeals for the Second Circuit vacated by Judge Carroll C. Hincks. He was confirmed by the Senate on September 1, 1960, and received his commission the next day. He assumed senior status on November 6, 1971. His service terminated on February 16, 1980, due to his death.

Later life and death

Smith resided in West Hartford, Connecticut. He died in Waterbury on February 16, 1980. Smith is interred at Calvary Cemetery in Waterbury.

References

Sources
 
 

1904 births
1980 deaths
Judges of the United States District Court for the District of Connecticut
United States district court judges appointed by Franklin D. Roosevelt
20th-century American judges
Judges of the United States Court of Appeals for the Second Circuit
United States court of appeals judges appointed by Dwight D. Eisenhower
Yale Law School alumni
Democratic Party members of the United States House of Representatives from Connecticut
20th-century American lawyers
20th-century American politicians